Ondřej Pála (born 20 September 1984) is a Czech former professional boxer who competed from 2005 to 2014. He holds a notable win over former world heavyweight champion Henry Akinwande.

Amateur career 
Pála started boxing at 17 under the lead of trainers Jan Balog and Antonín Hauer. His effort soon brought him the Czech Junior heavyweight title. At young age, he was also trying to compete in Muay Thai and Jiu jistu. In 2019, he returned to amateur boxing defeating Dominik Musil in the final of the Czech Championship, who is also a professional, by a second round TKO.

Professional career 
He turned professional in Médea boxing team and alongside his trainer Yuri Krivoruchko, he became one of the top prospects in the heavyweight division. He soon won several belts on the national level. In 2008, he beat the former WBO heavyweight champion Henry Akinwande. After the victory over Aleksey Masikin in March 2011, he became WBO European heavyweight champion and serious contender for the world belts.

Professional boxing record

{|class="wikitable" style="text-align:center; font-size:95%"
|-
!
!Result
!Record
!Opponent
!Type
!Round, time
!Date
!Location
!Notes
|-
|38
|Loss
|33–5
|style="text-align:left;"|David Price
|KO
|3 (8), 
|12 Apr 2014
|style="text-align:left;"|
|
|-
|37
|Win
|33–4
|style="text-align:left;"|Roman Cherney
|TKO
|1 (8), 
|26 Feb 2014
|style="text-align:left;"|
|
|-
|36
|Loss
|32–4
|style="text-align:left;"|Derek Chisora
|TKO
|3 (12), 
|30 Nov 2013
|style="text-align:left;"|
|style="text-align:left;"|
|-
|35
|Win
|32–3
|style="text-align:left;"|Yuri Bihoutseu
|PTS
|8
|19 Feb 2013
|style="text-align:left;"|
|
|-
|34
|Win
|31–3
|style="text-align:left;"|Radovan Kůča
|TKO
|2 (8), 
|22 Dec 2012
|style="text-align:left;"|
|
|-
|33
|Loss
|30–3
|style="text-align:left;"|Konstantin Airich
|TKO
|9 (12), 
|9 Mar 2012
|style="text-align:left;"|
|style="text-align:left;"|
|-
|32
|Win
|30–2
|style="text-align:left;"|Darnell Wilson
|UD
|12
|16 Nov 2011
|style="text-align:left;"|
|style="text-align:left;"|
|-
|31
|Win
|29–2
|style="text-align:left;"|Oleksiy Mazikin
|RTD
|7 (12), 
|1 Apr 2011
|style="text-align:left;"|
|style="text-align:left;"|
|-
|30
|Win
|28–2
|style="text-align:left;"|Ergin Solmaz
|TKO
|3 (8), 
|3 Dec 2010
|style="text-align:left;"|
|
|-
|29
|Win
|27–2
|style="text-align:left;"|Serhiy Babych
|TKO
|5 (8), 
|9 Apr 2010
|style="text-align:left;"|
|
|-
|28
|Win
|26–2
|style="text-align:left;"|Robert Hawkins
|UD
|8
|23 Jan 2010
|style="text-align:left;"|
|
|-
|27
|Win
|25–2
|style="text-align:left;"|Oleksiy Mazikin
|UD
|8
|24 Oct 2009
|style="text-align:left;"|
|
|-
|26
|Win
|24–2
|style="text-align:left;"|Raman Sukhaterin
|UD
|8
|5 Jun 2009
|style="text-align:left;"|
|
|-
|25
|Win
|23–2
|style="text-align:left;"|Konstantin Airich
|
|10
|6 Mar 2009
|style="text-align:left;"|
|
|-
|24
|Win
|22–2
|style="text-align:left;"|Harry Duiven Jr
|TKO
|11 (12), 
|17 Dec 2008
|style="text-align:left;"|
|style="text-align:left;"|
|-
|23
|Win
|21–2
|style="text-align:left;"|Pavel Šiška
|TKO
|2 (8), 
|21 Nov 2008
|style="text-align:left;"|
|
|-
|22
|Win
|20–2
|style="text-align:left;"|Henry Akinwande
|UD
|6
|4 Jul 2008
|style="text-align:left;"|
|
|-
|21
|Win
|19–2
|style="text-align:left;"|Arthur Cook
|TKO
|8 (10), 
|8 Feb 2008
|style="text-align:left;"|
|
|-
|20
|Win
|18–2
|style="text-align:left;"|Viacheslav Shcherbakov
|KO
|3 (8), 
|23 Nov 2007
|style="text-align:left;"|
|
|-
|19
|Win
|17–2
|style="text-align:left;"|Aleksandrs Borhovs
|RTD
|2 (8), 
|19 Oct 2007
|style="text-align:left;"|
|
|-
|18
|Win
|16–2
|style="text-align:left;"|Humberto Evora
|KO
|4 (8), 
|4 Jul 2007
|style="text-align:left;"|
|
|-
|17
|Win
|15–2
|style="text-align:left;"|Piotr Sapun
|KO
|1 (6), 
|28 Apr 2007
|style="text-align:left;"|
|
|-
|16
|Win
|14–2
|style="text-align:left;"|Tomáš Mrázek
|
|5 (10), 
|14 Dec 2006
|style="text-align:left;"|
|style="text-align:left;"|
|-
|15
|Win
|13–2
|style="text-align:left;"|Aleh Dubiaha
|TKO
|3 (6)
|14 Nov 2006
|style="text-align:left;"|
|
|-
|14
|Win
|12–2
|style="text-align:left;"|Imrich Borka
|TKO
|3 (6)
|17 Oct 2006
|style="text-align:left;"|
|
|-
|13
|Loss
|11–2
|style="text-align:left;"|Denis Boytsov
|TKO
|5 (10), 
|9 Sep 2006
|style="text-align:left;"|
|style="text-align:left;"|
|-
|12
|Win
|11–1
|style="text-align:left;"|Leo Sanchez
|UD
|6
|4 Jul 2006
|style="text-align:left;"|
|
|-
|11
|Loss
|10–1
|style="text-align:left;"|Rene Dettweiler
|
|8
|22 Apr 2006
|style="text-align:left;"|
|
|-
|10
|Win
|10–0
|style="text-align:left;"|Alexey Osokin
|PTS
|6
|23 Mar 2006
|style="text-align:left;"|
|
|-
|9
|Win
|9–0
|style="text-align:left;"|Aleksandrs Borhovs
|
|7 (10), 
|13 Dec 2005
|style="text-align:left;"|
|style="text-align:left;"|
|-
|8
|Win
|8–0
|style="text-align:left;"|Aliaksandr Mazaleu
|TKO
|1 (6)
|16 Nov 2005
|style="text-align:left;"|
|
|-
|7
|Win
|7–0
|style="text-align:left;"|Aleh Dubiaha
|TKO
|5 (6)
|6 Oct 2005
|style="text-align:left;"|
|
|-
|6
|Win
|6–0
|style="text-align:left;"|Mihail Bandarenka
|TKO
|4 (4)
|15 Sep 2005
|style="text-align:left;"|
|
|-
|5
|Win
|5–0
|style="text-align:left;"|Tomasz Zeprzalka
|
|4
|18 Aug 2005
|style="text-align:left;"|
|
|-
|4
|Win
|4–0
|style="text-align:left;"|Valeri Meierson
|TKO
|2 (4)
|26 May 2005
|style="text-align:left;"|
|
|-
|3
|Win
|3–0
|style="text-align:left;"|Peter Simko
|TKO
|4 (4)
|28 Apr 2005
|style="text-align:left;"|
|
|-
|2
|Win
|2–0
|style="text-align:left;"|Dzianis Shkalau
|TKO
|4 (4)
|27 Mar 2005
|style="text-align:left;"|
|
|-
|1
|Win
|1–0
|style="text-align:left;"|Uladzimir Tumanau
|
|2 (4)
|3 Mar 2005
|style="text-align:left;"|
|

References

External links 
Médea Boxing Team

Heavyweight boxers
1984 births
Living people
Czech male boxers
Sportspeople from Prague